The rivalry between the Delaware Fightin' Blue Hens and the James Madison Dukes is a matchup between two similarly sized schools in the Colonial Athletic Association.  Previously, it was a divisional game in the CAA South, and conference game in the Yankee Conference and Atlantic 10 beginning with the Dukes entry in 1993.  During this period, the teams have combined for three National Championships (Delaware in 2003; James Madison in 2004 and 2016), four National Runners-up (Delaware in 2007 and 2010; James Madison in 2017 and 2019), and 14 Conference Championships (Delaware in 1995, 1997, 2000, 2003, 2004, 2010, and 2020 and James Madison in 1999, 2004, 2008, 2015, 2016, 2017, and 2019).

On November 6, 2021, it was announced that the James Madison football program had accepted an invitation to move up to the FBS Subdivision and would join the Sun Belt Conference prior to the 2022 football season.

Game results

See also  
 List of NCAA college football rivalry games

References

College football rivalries in the United States
Delaware Fightin' Blue Hens football
James Madison Dukes football